The Black Hills is an isolated mountain range rising from the Great Plains of North America in western South Dakota and extending into Wyoming, United States. The Black Hills encompass the Black Hills National Forest. The Black Hills are considered a holy site. The hills are so called because of their dark appearance from a distance, as they are covered in evergreen trees.

Native Americans have a long history in the Black Hills and consider it a sacred site. After conquering the Cheyenne in 1776, the Lakota took the territory of the Black Hills, which became central to their culture. In 1868, the U.S. government signed the Fort Laramie Treaty of 1868, establishing the Great Sioux Reservation west of the Missouri River, and exempting the Black Hills from all white settlement forever. However, when settlers discovered gold there in 1874, as a result of George Armstrong Custer's Black Hills Expedition, miners swept into the area in a gold rush. The US government took the Black Hills and forcibly relocated the Lakota, following the Great Sioux War of 1876, to five smaller reservations in western South Dakota, selling off  of their former land. Unlike most of South Dakota, the Black Hills were settled by European Americans primarily from population centers to the west and south of the region, as miners flocked there from earlier gold boom locations in Colorado and Montana.

As the economy of the Black Hills has shifted away from natural resources (mining and timber) since the late 20th century, the hospitality and tourism industries have grown to take its place. Locals tend to divide the Black Hills into two areas: "The Southern Hills" and "The Northern Hills." The Southern Hills is home to Mount Rushmore, Wind Cave National Park, Jewel Cave National Monument, Black Elk Peak (the highest point in the United States east of the Rockies, formerly and still more commonly known as Harney Peak), Custer State Park (the largest state park in South Dakota), the Crazy Horse Memorial, and The Mammoth Site in Hot Springs, the world's largest mammoth research facility.

Attractions in the Northern Hills include Spearfish Canyon, historic Deadwood, and the Sturgis Motorcycle Rally, held each August. The first Rally was held on August 14, 1938, and the 75th Rally in 2015 saw more than one million bikers visit the Black Hills. Devils Tower National Monument, located in the Wyoming Black Hills, is an important nearby attraction and was the United States' first national monument.

History
Although the written history of the region begins with the Sioux domination of the land over the native Arikara tribes, researchers have carbon-dating and stratigraphic records to analyze the early history of the area. Scientists have been able to utilize carbon-dating to evaluate the age of tools found in the area, which indicate a human presence that dates as far back as 11,500 BC with the Clovis culture. Stratigraphic records indicate environmental changes in the land, such as flood and drought patterns. For example, large-scale flooding of the Black Hill basins occurs at a probability rate of 0.01, making such floods occur once in every 100 years. However, during The Medieval Climate Anomaly, or the Medieval Warm Period, flooding increased in the basins. A stratigraphic record of the area shows that during these 400 years, thirteen 100-year floods occurred in four of the region's basins, while the same four basins from the previous 800 years only experienced nine floods.

Early-Modern human activity 
The Arikara arrived by AD 1500, followed by the Cheyenne, Crow, Kiowa and Arapaho. The Lakota (also known as Sioux) arrived from Minnesota in the 18th century and drove out the other tribes, who moved west. They claimed the land, which they called  (Black Mountains). The mountains commonly became known as the Black Hills.

François and Louis de La Vérendrye probably traveled near the Black Hills in 1743. Fur trappers and traders had some dealings with the Native Americans.

European Americans increasingly encroached on Lakota territory. In order to secure safe passage of settlers on the Oregon Trail, and to end intertribal warfare, the United States government proposed the Fort Laramie Treaty of 1868, which established the Great Sioux Reservation west of the Missouri River and acknowledged indigenous control of the Black Hills. The treaty protected the Black Hills "forever" from European-American settlement. Both the Sioux and Cheyenne also claimed rights to the land, saying that their cultures considered it the axis mundi, or sacred center of the world.

Although rumors of gold in the Black Hills had circulated for decades (see Thoen Stone and Pierre-Jean De Smet), confirmation of the deposits came first in 1874, when Brevet Major General George Armstrong Custer of the 7th US Cavalry led an expedition there and discovered gold in French Creek. An official announcement of gold was made by the newspaper reporters accompanying the expedition. The following year, the Newton-Jenney Party conducted the first detailed survey of the Black Hills. The surveyor for the party, Dr. Valentine McGillycuddy, became the first European American to ascend to the top of Black Elk Peak.

During the 1875–1878 gold rush thousands of miners went to the Black Hills; in 1880, the area was the most densely populated part of the Dakota Territory. Three large towns developed in the Northern Hills: Deadwood, Central City, and Lead. Around these clustered groups of smaller gold camps, towns, and villages. Hill City and Custer City sprang up in the Southern Hills. Railroads were quickly constructed to the previously remote area. From 1880 onwards the gold mines yielded about $4,000,000 annually, and the silver mines about $3,000,000 annually.

American conquest of the Black Hills

The conflict over control of the region sparked the Black Hills War (1876), also known as the Great Sioux War, the last major Indian War on the Great Plains. Following the defeat of the Lakota and their Cheyenne and Arapaho allies in 1876, the United States took control of the Black Hills. Despite their forced relocations, the Lakota never accepted the validity of the US appropriation. They have continued to try to reclaim the property, and filed a suit against the federal government.

20th-century land claims

On July 23, 1980, in United States v. Sioux Nation of Indians, the Supreme Court of the United States ruled that the Black Hills were illegally taken by the federal government and ordered remuneration of the initial offering price plus interest, nearly $106 million. The Lakota refused the settlement, as they wanted the Black Hills returned to them. The money remains in an interest-bearing account, which, as of 2015, amounts to over $1.2 billion, but the Lakota still refuse to take the money. They believe that accepting the settlement would allow the US government to justify taking ownership of the Black Hills.

In 2012, United Nations Special Rapporteur James Anaya conducted a 12-day tour of Native Americans' land to determine how the U.S. is carrying out the United Nations Declaration on the Rights of Indigenous Peoples, endorsed in 2010 by the Obama administration. Anaya met with tribes in seven states on reservations and in urban areas as well as with members of the Obama administration and the Senate Committee on Indian Affairs. In an appeal issued August 21, 2012, Anaya brought a sale of over 1,900 acres of land in Black Hills by the Reynolds family to the attention of the U.S. government and asked that it disclose measures taken by federal or state governments to address Sioux concerns over the sale of the land within Reynolds Prairie. These acres consist of five land tracts, including the sacred Pe' Sla site for Dakota, Lakota, and Nakota peoples; natives to the Black Hills fundraised to buy the land during the Reynolds' sale.

On January 15, 2013, the U.S. responded, telling Anaya that it "understands several tribes purchased the Pe' Sla sacred site around November 30, 2012" meaning the Pe' Sla is officially Sioux land. After 2,022 acres of Pe' Sla (Reynolds Prairie) were granted Federal Indian trust status by the Bureau of Indian Affairs in March 2016, the Shakopee Mdewakanton tribe released a statement acknowledging the 2012 land purchase of 1,940 acres of Pe' Sla and also stated that this purchase was the result of a joint effort by the Rosebud, Shakopee Mdewakanton, Crow Creek, and Standing Rock Sioux Tribes. In March 2017, Pennington County agreed to abandon its claim to the Pe' Sla area and recognize its Federal Indian trust status. In 2016, the Southern Cheyenne and Arapaho Tribe of Oklahoma, the Northern Cheyenne Tribe of Montana and the Rosebud Sioux Tribe of South Dakota bought land near the sacred Bear Butte site for $1.1 million. In 2018, the Northern Cheyenne Tribe of Montana and the Arapahoe Tribe of Oklahoma teamed together to purchase land near Bear Butte for $2.3 million.

Geology

The geology of the Black Hills is complex. A Tertiary mountain-building episode is responsible for the uplift and current topography of the Black Hills region. This uplift was marked by volcanic activity in the northern Black Hills. The southern Black Hills are characterized by Precambrian granite, pegmatite, and metamorphic rocks that comprise the core of the entire Black Hills uplift. This core is rimmed by Paleozoic, Mesozoic, and Cenozoic sedimentary rocks. The stratigraphy of the Black Hills is laid out like a target, as it is an oval dome, with rings of different rock types dipping away from the center.

Precambrian

The 'bull's eye' of this target is called the granite core. The granite of the Black Hills was emplaced by magma generated during the Trans-Hudson orogeny and contains abundant pegmatite. The core of the Black Hills has been dated to 1.8 billion years. Other localized deposits have been dated to around 2.2 to 2.8 billion years. One of these is located in the northern hills. It is called French Creek Granite although it has been metamorphosed into gneiss. The other is called the Bear Mountain complex, and it is located in the west-central part of the hills.

"Making a concentric ring around the core is the metamorphic zone. The rocks in this ring are all very old, as much as 2 billion years and older. This zone is very complex, filled with many diverse rock types. The rocks were originally sedimentary until there was a collision between the North American continent and a terrane. This collision, called the Trans-Hudson Orogeny, caused the original rocks to fold and twist into a vast mountain range. Over the millions of years, these tilted rocks, which in many areas are tilted to 90 degrees or more, eroded. Today we see the evidence of this erosion in the Black Hills, where the metamorphic rocks end in an angular unconformity below the younger sedimentary layers.

Paleozoic
The final layers of the Black Hills consist of sedimentary rocks. The oldest lie on top of the metamorphic layers at a much shallower angle. This rock called the Deadwood Formation is mostly sandstone and was the source of gold found in the Deadwood area. Above the Deadwood Formation lies the Englewood Formation and Pahasapa limestone, which is the source of the more than 200 caves found in the Black Hills, including Jewel Cave and Wind Cave. The Minnelusa Formation is next and is composed of highly variable sandstones and limestones followed by the Opeche shale and the Minnekahta limestone.

Mesozoic
The next rock layer, the Spearfish Formation, forms a valley around the hills called the Red Valley and is often referred to as the Race Track. It is mostly red shale with beds of gypsum, and circles much of the Black Hills. These shale and gypsum beds, as well as the nearby limestone beds of the Minnekahta, are used in the manufacture of cement at a cement plant in Rapid City. Next is the shale and sandstone Sundance Formation, which is topped by the Morrison Formation and the Unkpapa sandstone.

The outermost feature of the dome stands out as a hogback ridge. The ridge is made out of the Lakota Formation and the Fallriver sandstone, which are collectively called the Inyan Kara Group. Above this, the layers of rocks are less distinct and are all mainly grey shale with three exceptions: the Newcastle sandstone; the Greenhorn limestone, which contains many shark teeth fossils; and the Niobrara Formation, which is composed mainly of chalk. These outer ridges are called cuestas.

Cenozoic

The preceding layers were deposited horizontally. All of them can be seen in core samples and well logs from the flattest parts of the Great Plains. It took a period of uplift to bring them to their present topographical levels in the Black Hills. This uplift called the Laramide orogeny, began around the beginning of the Cenozoic and left a line of igneous rocks through the northern hills superimposed on the rocks already discussed. This line extends from Bear Butte in the east to Devils Tower in the west. Evidence of Cenozoic volcanic eruptions, if this happened, has long since been eroded.

The Black Hills also has a 'skirt' of gravel covering them in areas, which are called pediments. Formed as the waterways cut down into the uplifting hills, they represent the former locations of today's rivers. These beds are generally around 10,000 years old or younger, judging by the artifacts and fossils found. A few places, mainly in the high elevations, are older, as old as 20 million years, according to camel and rodent fossils found. Some gravels have been found but for the most part, these older beds have been eroded.

Biosystems

As with the geology, the biology of the Black Hills is complex.  Most of the Hills are a fire-climax ponderosa pine forest, with Black Hills spruce (Picea glauca var. densata) occurring in cool moist valleys of the Northern Hills. Oddly, this endemic variety of spruce does not occur in the moist Bear Lodge Mountains, which make up most of the Wyoming portion of the Black Hills. Large open parks (mountain meadows) with lush grassland rather than forest are scattered through the Hills (especially the western portion), and the southern edge of the Hills, due to the rainshadow of the higher elevations, are covered by a dry pine savannah, with stands of mountain mahogany and Rocky Mountain juniper.

Wildlife is both diverse and plentiful.  Black Hills creeks are known for their trout, while the forests and grasslands offer good habitat for American bison, white-tailed and mule deer, pronghorn, bighorn sheep, mountain lions, and a variety of smaller animals, like prairie dogs, American martens, American red squirrels, Northern flying squirrels, yellow-bellied marmots, and fox squirrels. Biologically, the Black Hills is a meeting and mixing place, with species common to regions to the east, west, north, and south. The Hills do, however, support some endemic taxa, the most famous of which is probably white-winged junco (Junco hyemalis aikeni). Some other endemics are Cooper's Rocky Mountain snail, Black Hills subspecies of  red-bellied snake, and a Black Hills subspecies of southern red-backed vole. Some birds that are only in the Black Hills and not the rest of South Dakota are pinyon jay, Canada jay, three-toed woodpecker, black-backed woodpecker, American dipper, ruffed grouse, and others.

Regions of the Black Hills

The northern Black Hills approximate Lawrence and Meade Counties and are roughly equivalent to the Northern Hills District of the Black Hills National Forest. The central Black Hills (the Mystic District of the Black Hills National Forest) are located in Pennington County west of Rapid City. The southern Black Hills are in Custer and Fall River Counties and are administered in the national forest's Hell Canyon District. Finally, Wyoming's Black Hills follow the Bearlodge District, approximately Weston and Crook Counties.

Geologically separate from the Black Hills are the Elk Mountains, a small range forming the southwest portion of the region.

Tourism and economy

The region is home to Mount Rushmore National Memorial, Wind Cave National Park, Jewel Cave National Monument, Black Elk Peak, Custer State Park (the largest state park in South Dakota, and one of the largest in the US), Bear Butte State Park, Devils Tower National Monument, and the Crazy Horse Memorial. The Black Hills also hosts the Sturgis Motorcycle Rally each August. The rally was started in 1940 and the 65th Rally in 2005 saw more than 550,000 bikers visit the Black Hills. It is a key part of the regional economy.

The George S. Mickelson Trail is a recently opened multi-use path through the Black Hills that follows the abandoned track of the historic railroad route from Edgemont to Deadwood. The train used to be the only way to bring supplies to the miners in the Hills. The cost is $4 per day or $15 annually.

Today, the major city in the Black Hills is Rapid City, with an incorporated population of almost 70,000 and a metropolitan population of 125,000. It serves a market area covering much of five states: North and South Dakota, Nebraska, Wyoming, and Montana. In addition to tourism and mining (including coal, specialty minerals, and the now declining gold mining), the Black Hills economy includes ranching (sheep and cattle, primarily, with bison and ratites becoming more common), timber (lumber), Ellsworth Air Force Base, and some manufacturing, including Black Hills gold jewelry, cement, electronics, cabinetry, guns and ammunition.

In many ways, the Black Hills functions as a very spread-out urban area with a population (not counting tourists) of 250,000. Other important Black Hills cities and towns include:
Belle Fourche, a ranching town
Custer, a mining and tourism town and headquarters for Black Hills National Forest
Deadwood, a historic and well-preserved gambling mecca
Hill City, a timber and tourism town in the center of the Hills, where the Black Hills Central Railroad operates historic steam trains over the former CB&Q line to Keystone
Hot Springs, an old resort town in the southern Hills
Keystone, a tourism town just outside Mount Rushmore 
Lead, home of the now-closed Homestake Mine (gold) and the Sanford Underground Research Facility
Newcastle, center of the Black Hills petroleum production and refining
Spearfish, home of Black Hills State University
Sturgis, originally a military town (Fort Meade, now a VA center, is located just to the east).  Now famous for one of the largest motorcycle rallies in the world.

See also
 Cypress Hills (Canada), a similar landform
 The Black Hills of Dakota (song)

References
Notes

Bibliography

External links

Black Hills National Forest
An article about the land the people of Black Hills

 
Mount Rushmore
Physiographic sections
Mountain ranges of South Dakota
Mountain ranges of Wyoming
Regions of South Dakota
Regions of Wyoming
Great Plains
Tertiary volcanism
Sacred mountains
Religious places of the indigenous peoples of North America
Lakota mythology
Economy of South Dakota
Great Sioux War of 1876
Landforms of Lawrence County, South Dakota
Landforms of Meade County, South Dakota
Landforms of Pennington County, South Dakota
Landforms of Custer County, South Dakota
Landforms of Weston County, Wyoming
Landforms of Crook County, Wyoming